Malek Jaziri and Blaž Rola were the defending champions but chose not to defend their title.

Hunter Reese and Tennys Sandgren won the title after defeating Martin Damm and Mitchell Krueger 6–7(4–7), 7–6(7–3), [10–5] in the final.

Seeds

Draw

References

External links
 Main draw

Knoxville Challenger - Doubles
2022 Doubles